Boavista Futebol Clube, commonly known as Boavista, is a Portuguese sports club from the city of Porto. Founded on 1 August 1903 by British entrepreneurs and Portuguese textile workers (thus the "FC" being appended – the British way as opposed to the more common Portuguese way of being prepended to the club's name), it is one of the oldest clubs in the country and plays in the Primeira Liga, Portuguese football's top flight.

Boavista grew to become an important sports club in Portugal, with sections dedicated to several sports including football, chess, gymnastics, bicycle racing, futsal, volleyball, rink hockey and boxing, among others, with the most notable being the football section with their trademark chequered white and black shirts. The club is the most eclectic one in the North region of Portugal, and one of the most eclectic sports clubs in Portugal, practicing a total of 16 sports.

With 9 major domestic trophies won (1 Championship, 5 Portuguese Cups and 3 domestic Super Cups, all during the presidencies of Valentim Loureiro or João Loureiro, of the Loureiro family), Boavista is the most decorated Portuguese football club after the "Big Three" (Benfica, Porto and Sporting CP). Boavista spent 39 consecutive seasons in the Primeira Liga (50 in total) and, together with Belenenses, is the only team outside the "Big Three" to have won the Portuguese Championship, in the 2000–01 season. Boavista has a rivalry with fellow city club Porto; the matches between the clubs are sometimes called O Derby da Invicta.

Its stadium, Estádio do Bessa, was built in 1973, although football has been played there at the former 'Campo do Bessa' since the 1910s, and was revamped for use in Euro 2004.

History

Foundation and the chequered shirts (1903–1933)

The club was founded on 1 August 1903, in the Boavista area of the western part of the city of Porto, by two English brothers, Harry and Dick Lowe. Having received an imported football from their father in England, they founded The Boavista Footballers, and an early rival was another English club in the city, the Oporto Cricket and Lawn Tennis Club. The team had an early schism as its British contingent refused to play on Sundays due to their Anglican faith, while the Catholic locals could only play on Sundays due to work commitments; the locals won, drastically changing the demographics of the club. In 1910 the current name was adopted, and on 11 April that year the ground now occupied by the Estádio do Bessa was inaugurated with a match against Leixões SC. In 1913–14, the team won the inaugural Porto Football Association.

In the 1920s the club increased the number of sports practiced. The team boasted "the best defensive trio of the North": goalkeeper Casoto and defenders Lúzia and Óscar Vasques de Carvalho. In the following decade, the club lobbied for the legalisation of professionalism after being sanctioned, having been investigated after complaining that FC Porto had paid Boavista's Nova to join them. In 1933, the club adopted its black-and-white shirts, based on a French team that club president Artur Oliveira Valença had watched.

League entry and golden 1970s (1934–1980)
Boavista's first decades in league football saw the club bounce between the Primeira and the Segunda Divisão, winning the latter's title in 1937 and 1950. In 1966, they fell to the Terceira Divisão, and stayed there for two years.

The team bounced back to the top flight by 1970 with two consecutive promotions, finished renovation of its stadium two years later and in 1974 hired manager José Maria Pedroto and president Valentim Loureiro. In their first year, Boavista achieved their best classification of fourth in the 1974-1975 championship, and won the Taça de Portugal for the first time after defeating Benfica 2–1 in the final. A year later, the club finished as runners-up to S.L. Benfica by two points, and defended their cup title by defeating Vitória de Guimarães 2–1 in the 1976 final at rival Porto's Estádio das Antas; Pedroto left for Porto at the end of the season.

Experienced English manager Jimmy Hagan led the club to its third Taça de Portugal win in five years after defeating Sporting CP 1–0 in the replay of the 1979 final, after a 1–1 draw occurred the day prior. At the beginning of the following season, Porto and Boavista organised the first edition of the Portuguese Supercup, a season-opening match between the league and cup holders. The match was contested at the Estádio das Antas, and Boavista (with new manager Mário Lino) beat Pedroto's Porto 2–1 in a violent match where Boavista had two men sent off.

From contenders to Champions and European forays (1980–2003)

In 1997, Valentim Loureiro was succeeded as president by his son João, who at 34 was the youngest in the whole league. Also, former Portugal international Jaime Pacheco was appointed manager, and led the club to runners-up in 1999 and fourth place in 2000. In 2000–01, they won the derby in the second half of the season against Porto and went on to win the league with a 3–0 win over C.D. Aves on 18 May. This was only the second time that a team from outside the Big Three won the league, after C.F. Os Belenenses in 1946. Pacheco's team conceded just 22 goals in 34 games and lost at home only once. The team featured Ricardo in goal, academy product Petit in midfield, Bolivian free-kick specialist Erwin Sánchez in attacking midfield, Duda and Martelinho on the wings, and Brazilian striker Elpídio Silva was the club's top scorer with 11 goals.

After finishing runners-up to Sporting a year later, the squad began to break up, with Petit heading to Benfica and fellow midfielder Pedro Emanuel going to Porto; both skippered their new teams. The club rebuilt the Estádio do Bessa for UEFA Euro 2004, contributing to their financial problems. Pacheco left for Spain's RCD Mallorca in 2003, returning soon to replace Sánchez briefly as manager the following year, and came back again in October 2006.

Boavista were regulars in UEFA competitions in the 1990 and early 2000s. In the 2002–03 UEFA Cup, they reached the semi-finals before a 2–1 aggregate loss to Celtic due to a late Henrik Larsson strike; they would have faced Porto in the final.

Downfall and return (2008–present)
In June 2008, Boavista was sentenced to relegation for its part in the Apito Dourado (Golden Whistle) matchfixing scandal, for three games in the 2003–04 season. A year later the club was relegated again: originally saved by promoted club F.C. Vizela being sanctioned for corruption, the team withdrew from the second division for financial reasons.

In January 2013, João Loureiro, pressed by thousands of members of the club to return to the presidency, was elected president once again. After a long legal battle, in June 2013, Boavista was entitled the right to come back to the Primeira Liga. Also, after a negotiation with the creditors of the club, the €65 million debt was cut in half. After a six-year absence, Boavista returned to the Primeira Liga in the 2014–15 season, coached by Petit, a member of the title-winning side of 2001.

In October 2020, Boavista's members approved of investment from Spanish-Luxembourgish businessman Gérard Lopez, owner of Ligue 1 club Lille OSC. Petit returned as manager, leading the club to the Taça da Liga semi-finals for the first time in 2021–22.

Honours
Primeira Liga
 Winners (1): 2000–01
2nd place (3): 1975–76, 1998–99, 2001–02

Taça de Portugal
 Winners (5): 1974–75, 1975–76, 1978–79, 1991–92, 1996–97
Runners-up (1): 1992–93

Supertaça de Portugal
 Winners (3): 1979, 1992, 1997
Runners-up (1): 2001

Segunda Divisão
 Winners (2): 1936–37, 1949–50

Campeonato do Porto
 Winners (1): 1913–14

League and cup history
The club has made 55 appearances at the top level of Portuguese football and has won the Portuguese cup five times. In 1979, it also won the very first edition of the national supercup.

  Top scorer
  Champions
  Promoted
  Promoted in court
  Relegated
  Relegated in court

As of 16 May 2022

Sources: Soccer Library, Zero a Zero,
 Fora de Jogo.

European record

Overview

 Biggest win:  Boavista 8–0  Sliema Wanderers, 05/10/1979, Estádio do Bessa, Porto
 Biggest defeat:  Lazio 5–0  Boavista, 28/09/1977, Stadio Olimpico, Rome
 Players with most UEFA appearances:  Erwin Sánchez and  Ricardo, 35 matches
 Top scorers in UEFA club competitions:  Elpídio Silva, 11 goals

Matches

Players

Current squad

Out on loan

Retired numbers

Club Officials

Coaches
Since 1970

 Fernando Caiado (1970–71)
 Joaquim Meirim (1971)
 Jaime Garcia (caretaker manager) (1971)
 António Teixeira (1971–72)
 Jaime Garcia (caretaker manager) (1972)
 Dante Bianchi (1972)
 Aymoré Moreira (1972-1974)
 José Maria Pedroto (1974–76)
 Mário Wilson (1976–77)
 Fernando Caiado (1977)
 Jimmy Hagan (1978)
 José Carlos (1978)
 Jimmy Hagan (1978–79)
 Mário Lino (1979-1980)
 António Teixeira (1980)
 Henrique Calisto (1981)
 Mário Lino (1981–82)
 Álvaro Carolino (1982)
 Hermann Stessl (1982)
 Joaquim Meirim (1982)
 Ferdinand Smetana (1982–83)
 Manuel Barbosa (1983)
 Henrique Calisto (1983-1984)
 Mário Wilson (1984)
 João Alves (1984–86)
 José Torres (1987)
 Pepe (1987–88)
 Raul Águas (1988–89)
 Manuel Barbosa (1989–90)
 João Alves (1990)
 Raul Águas (1990–91)
 Manuel José (1991-1996)
 João Alves (1996–97)
 Zoran Filipović (1997)
 Rui Casaca (1997)
 Mário Reis (1997-1998)
 Jaime Pacheco (1998-2004)
 Erwin Sánchez (2004)
 Jaime Pacheco (2004)
 Pedro Barny (2005)
 Carlos Brito (2005-2006)
 Jesualdo Ferreira (2006)
 Pedro Barny (caretaker manager) (2006)
 Željko Petrović (2006)
 Jaime Pacheco (2006–08)
 Rui Bento (2008-2009)
 Jorge Madureira (2009)
 Vítor Paneira (2009-2010)
 Rui Ferreira (2010–11)
 Gouveia (2011)
 Mário Silva (2011)
 Rui Amorim (caretaker manager) (2011)
 Ferreirinha (2011–2012)
 Amândio Barreiras (2012)
 Petit (2012–2015)
 Erwin Sánchez (2015-2016)
 Miguel Leal (2016-2017)
 Jorge Simão (2017–2019)
 Lito Vidigal (2019)
 Daniel Ramos (2019–2020)
 Vasco Seabra (2020)
 Jesualdo Ferreira (2021)
 João Pedro Sousa (2021)
 Petit (2021–)

Stadium

The Estádio do Bessa (later Estádio do Bessa XXI) is Boavista's home ground, used for football and occasionally for music concerts. The stadium was first used in 1911, then known as 'Campo do Bessa'.

The stadium had several renovations in its history, namely in 1967–72, where turf was installed as well as floodlights. Like other stadiums used in UEFA Euro 2004, the stadium was rebuilt for the competition, but on top of the old stands, and each one of them at a different time, allowing Boavista to continue playing there. It cost €45,164,726, from which €7,785,735 were supported from the Portuguese state, and featured an all-seater capacity of 28,263 spectators. Plans for improvement actually existed before the organization of the Euro 2004 was given to Portugal in 1999, and by then, the first works were already underway. It was designed by Grupo 3 Arquitectura.

The stadium has also been used several times in matches of the Portuguese national team.

Colours
Boavista's black-and-white chequered shirt was introduced by journalist and club president Artur Oliveira Valença, based on a French team he had seen.

Kit evolution

Women's team
The women's team is one of the strongest in Portugal, having won several titles in a row during the 1990s, as well as the formation U-19, U-17. U-15 and U-13 teams, that won all national championships, and brought up several talented and famous international players.

See also
Boavista (cycling team)
Boavista (futsal)
Boavista FC (women)

Footnotes

External links

  
 Boavista F.C. at Primeira Liga 

 
Football clubs in Portugal
Football clubs in Porto
Sports clubs established in 1903
Association football clubs established in 1903
Multi-sport clubs in Portugal
1903 establishments in Portugal
Taça de Portugal winners
Primeira Liga clubs
Liga Portugal 2 clubs